The John Locke Foundation (JLF) is a conservative think tank based in North Carolina. The organization was founded in 1990 to work "for truth, for freedom, and for the future of North Carolina." It is named after the philosopher John Locke, who was a primary contributor to classical liberalism. JLF was co-founded by Art Pope, a North Carolina businessman active in politics.  Pope's family foundation provides most of the support for the center.

The organization's stated mission is to "employ research, journalism, and outreach programs to transform government through competition, innovation, personal freedom, and personal responsibility. JLF seeks a better balance between the public sector and private institutions of family, faith, community, and enterprise."

The organization is concerned primarily with state and local issues. JLF advocates lowering taxes, and encouraging free markets. Amy Oliver Cooke is its current president. The John William Pope Center for Higher Education Policy was in its initial stages a project of the John Locke Foundation.

Activities
The John Locke Foundation's research staff regularly publishes scholarly articles and reports on topics such as budget and tax policy; regulatory, legal, and environmental policy; education policy; and county and local government, including transportation and land-use policies. In 2015, JLF initiated the publication of an index of freedom, ranking each of the states in their relative freedom.

According to North Carolina's WRAL news, John Locke Foundation staff are frequently quoted in news outlets across the state and appear as guests on public affairs programs, and columns by foundation staff appear in local newspapers.

Every two years, JLF produces an agenda document that focuses on issues that JLF believes the North Carolina state and local governments must address. The organization also publishes the Carolina Journal, a monthly publication, as well as CarolinaJournal.com and a weekly hour-long news program, Carolina Journal Radio.

See also

John William Pope Foundation

References

External links
 John Locke Foundation Website
 EDIRC listing (provided by RePEc)
 Organizational Profile – National Center for Charitable Statistics (Urban Institute)

Political and economic think tanks in the United States
John Locke
Non-profit organizations based in North Carolina
Political and economic research foundations in the United States
Organizations based in Raleigh, North Carolina
1990 establishments in North Carolina
Conservative organizations in the United States